Let Me Dream Again is a 1900 British short  silent drama film, directed by George Albert Smith, featuring a man dreaming about an attractive young woman and then waking up next to his wife. The film stars Smith's real wife, Laura Bayley, as the woman of his fantasies.  Bayley would later appear in Smith's 1906 film Mary Jane's Mishap. The film, according to Michael Brooke of BFI Screenonline, "is an excellent example of an early two-shot film, and is particularly interesting for the way it attempts a primitive dissolve by letting the first shot slip out of focus before cutting to the second shot, which starts off out of focus and gradually sharpens."  This appears to be the first use of a dissolve transition to signify a movement of a dreaming state to one of reality.

Of further interest is the camera composition of the husband and wife in bed.  The bed is placed against a wall and in front of a camera that is fixed to the floor, giving the appearance of two people lying in bed, when in reality they are standing.  The film was shot in Smith's own studio, the former pump house at St Ann's Well Gardens in Hove.  The film was remade by Ferdinand Zecca for Pathé as Dream and Reality (1901).

References

External links
 

1900 films
1900s British films
British black-and-white films
British silent short films
1900 drama films
1900 short films
British drama short films
Films directed by George Albert Smith
Articles containing video clips
Silent drama films